Wittmackia laevigata is a species of plant in the family Bromeliaceae. This species is endemic to the State of Bahia in eastern Brazil.

References

laevigata
Endemic flora of Brazil
Plants described in 2005
Flora of Bahia